Feliks de Melfort was a Polish military officer and a freedom fighter. A graduate of Szkoła Rycerska, in 1781 he was promoted to the rank of Captain and attached to the Royal Foot Guards Regiment. Following the failure of the Kościuszko's Uprising and the partitions of Poland, he left for Italy, where he joined the Polish Legions in Italy. A commander of the 1st battalion of the 1st Legion, he was wounded in the battle of Bosco and retired from active service in 1800.

References

Polish Army officers
18th-century Polish–Lithuanian military personnel
Polish legionnaires (Napoleonic period)